Lake Road railway station was a flag station in the Waikato Region and on the North Island Main Trunk in New Zealand.

By February 1880 the contractor, Mr Fallon, had laid the rails from Ōhaupō to a point south of Lake Road. The line opened to Te Awamutu on Thursday 1 July 1880. Lake Road wasn't shown in the original timetable, but, in 1880, there was pressure from local farmers for a station between Ōhaupō and Ngaroto.

In October 1880 it was decided to open a 7th class station at Wrights Road, mid-way between Ōhaupō and Ngaroto. David Henderson won the contract for the station buildings in November 1880. The station first appeared in the 1 March 1881 timetable. By 1884 Lake Road had a shelter shed, platform and cart approach. Toilets were added in 1908, but there was also a complaint that the platform was only long enough for two coaches.

By 1911 it also had a loading bank. That year a man died when he'd not informed the guard that he wanted to get off at the flag station and fell from the moving train. In 1914 the 1 in 43 gradient at Lake Road was eased to 1 in 100, allowing train tonnages to be increased from a maximum of 209 to 494 tons.

On Sunday 7 July 1940 Lake Road closed to all traffic.

References

External links
Mataura Ensign , 29 March 1911, p. 4 - 2 men killed in railway ballast pit

Railway stations opened in 1881
Railway stations closed in 1940
Waipa District
Defunct railway stations in New Zealand
Rail transport in Waikato
Buildings and structures in Waikato